N-acetylglucosamine-1-phosphodiester alpha-N-acetylglucosaminidase is an enzyme that in humans is encoded by the NAGPA gene.

Hydrolases are transported to lysosomes after binding to mannose 6-phosphate receptors in the trans-Golgi network. This gene encodes the enzyme that catalyzes the second step in the formation of the mannose 6-phosphate recognition marker on lysosomal hydrolases. Commonly known as 'uncovering enzyme' or UCE, this enzyme removes N-acetyl-D-glucosamine (GlcNAc) residues from GlcNAc-alpha-P-mannose moieties and thereby produces the recognition marker. This reaction most likely occurs in the trans-Golgi network. This enzyme functions as a homotetramer of two disulfide-linked homodimers. In addition to having an N-terminal signal peptide, the protein's C-terminus contains multiple signals for trafficking it between lysosomes, the plasma membrane, and trans-Golgi network.

To date, the only disorder in humans associated with this gene is Persistent Neurodevelopmental Stuttering (PNdS).

References

Further reading

Human proteins